is a Japanese footballer who plays for Renofa Yamaguchi.

Club statistics
Updated to 2 January 2020.

References

External links
Profile at Ventforet Kofu

1997 births
Living people
People from Anjō
Association football people from Aichi Prefecture
Japanese footballers
J1 League players
J2 League players
Ventforet Kofu players
Renofa Yamaguchi FC players
Association football forwards